Carpet Denim is the fifth studio album by American surf rock band, Tijuana Panthers. The album was released on July 12, 2019 through Innovative Leisure.

Track listing

Personnel 
The following individuals were credited with the production and packaging of the album.

 Jonny Bell — Producer
 Daniel Michicoff — Bass, Composer, Guitar, Keyboards, Vocals
 Phil Shaheen — Composer, Drums, Synthesizer, Vocals
 Michael Shelbourn — Drums
 Michael Stonis — Photography
 Tijuana Panthers — Primary Artist
 Chad Wachtel — Composer, Guitar, Vocals

References

External links 
 
 

2019 albums
Tijuana Panthers albums
Innovative Leisure albums